The Cibao, usually referred as "El Cibao", is a region of the Dominican Republic located at the northern part of the country. As of 2009 the Cibao has a population of 5,622,378 making it the most populous region in the country.

The region constitutes a "developed macro-region"; with a large industrial base and high levels of progress among its inhabitants, it has the highest levels of education and the highest quality of life among the three main regions of the Dominican Republic. Cibao is social-culturally characterized by the overwhelming predominance of the European legacy in the island, and economically for being the most prosperous region in the country.

Etymology
Cibao was a native name for the island, although the Spanish used it during the Spanish conquest to refer to the rich and fertile valley between the Central and Septentrional mountain ranges.

Geography and economy

El Cibao occupies the central and northern part of the Dominican territory. To the north and east of the region lies the Atlantic Ocean; to its west lies the Republic of Haiti and to the south the Central Range, which separates El Cibao from the other natural regions.

The Cordillera Central mountain range is located within El Cibao, containing the highest peak in all of the Caribbean, Pico Duarte. Two of the largest rivers of the country are also located inside this region: the Yaque del Norte, the largest river of the Dominican Republic, and the Yuna river. Both of these rivers contain several chains of dams used to provide the region with water for irrigation (since agriculture is the main activity of the area) and hydroelectric energy. Rice, coffee and cacao are the most important crops grown in the area.

The central mountain range also has important mining activity. Its main mineral resources include gold, iron and nickel, among others. The largest gold mine in the Americas and second largest in the world, the Pueblo Viejo mine, is located in the Cibao region. The internationally known Barrick Gold and Falconbridge are the companies in charge of the extraction of these ores.

Culture

The valley is not only a geographical unit, but also a cultural and linguistic unit. The Cibao region is considered to be the cultural heartland of the Dominican Republic. The typical accent spoken in the Cibao region is a mixture of two dialects: that of the 16th- and 17th-century Portuguese colonists in the Cibao valley, and of the 18th-century Canarian settlers.

Merengue music, played using the güira, tambora and accordion, was originated in El Cibao. The original folk type of merengue is known as perico ripiao or típico, which is played to this day by local musical groups, as a variation of the merengue, with a faster pace.

During Late January and through February, several carnivals are held within the region. The most popular of these festivals belongs to the province of La Vega, and dates back to the first European settlements. It began as a religious activity celebrating the pre-Lent season, and the carnival's theme revolves around the victory of good over evil.

Many important Dominican patriots were of Cibaenian origin. Among the most important are local generals José Desiderio Valverde and José Antonio Salcedo, who were responsible for the restoration of the Republic in the later decades of the 1800s. During the Trujillo dictatorship, the Mirabal sisters arranged clandestine organizations to rebel against the fascist dictatorship. The sisters were brutally murdered in 1960, and remain today as some of the biggest martyrs on behalf of the Dominican nation.

The bulk of the population is mainly concentrated in the center of the region. The city of Santiago de los Caballeros constitutes the regional center and main focus of development of the area.

Provinces

References

Regions of the Dominican Republic